The Taste of Tasmania is Tasmania's largest food and wine festival. Established in 1988, the Festival operates from 28 December–3 January and will celebrate its 32nd year in 2022. The festival is held in Hobart's Salamanca Place and waterfront precinct.  The festival was run by the City of Hobart.

History 
In 2019, the council reduced funding for the festival, and approved a funding deal over three-years of $19 million.The funding was $1.4 billin n in 2019–20, $1 million in 2020–21, and was to be $900,000 in 2021–22. The shortfall was filled by increased funding from the state government, and also covered the leasing of the venue, Princes Wharf No1.

In 2020 the Festival was cancelled due to the COVID-19 pandemic in Australia. It was also not held in 2021.

In May 2021 Hobart City Council voted to end its ownership of the festival.

About
The Taste of Tasmania focuses on promoting Tasmanian produce wherever possible. Visitation is estimated at up to 500,000 people each year over the one-week period.

The Taste of Tasmania is the combination of the Taste of Tasmania and the Hobart Summer Festival. Following the culmination of the Sydney to Hobart Yacht Race, and associated boost in tourism, the Festival takes advantage of Hobart's warm summer, picturesque location and long hours of sunlight to showcase the best in Tasmanian produce, arts, crafts, and entertainment.

References

External links
  Taste Festival official site
 Hobart City Council

Festivals in Hobart
Food and drink festivals in Australia
Recurring events established in 1988
1988 establishments in Australia
Wine festivals in Australia